Ferguson v. JONAH, New Jersey Superior Court No. L-5473-12 (N.J. Super. Ct. Law Div. 2015) is a landmark LGBT civil rights case in which a New Jersey jury unanimously determined that conversion therapy, also called "reparative therapy," "reorientation therapy," or "ex-gay therapy" constituted consumer fraud. The lawsuit accused Jews Offering New Alternatives to Homosexuality or JONAH (which changed its name to Jews Offering New Alternatives for Healing) of consumer fraud for selling services that they claimed could change a person from gay to straight. The lawsuit charged that the two JONAH co-founders, Arthur Goldberg and Elaine Berk, plus Alan Downing, a life coach who worked in the JONAH office, had violated the New Jersey Consumer Fraud Act. This case was a first-of-its-kind lawsuit to use consumer protection laws to legally challenge the practice of conversion therapy. The Southern Poverty Law Center filed the case in November 2012 and the case went to trial on June 3, 2015. A pretrial ruling by the Court declared for the first time in American history that homosexuality was not a mental disease, disorder, or equivalent thereof as a matter of law. On June 25, 2015, after a three-week trial, the jury unanimously found the defendants liable for consumer fraud and unconscionable business practices, ordered JONAH to pay $72,400 to compensate the plaintiffs plus an undisclosed amount for attorney's fees, ordered that JONAH be permanently closed, and forbid the defendants from ever starting a similar organization in New Jersey.

Background
Conversion therapy also called Sexual Orientation Change Efforts have a long history in the United States. Conversion therapy claims to help people, usually gay men, overcome their unwanted homosexual attractions, thereby “converting” them from gay to straight. In the late nineteenth century, doctors used castration and in some cases, testicle implantation, as a method to cure homosexuality.   By the early twentieth century, doctors moved away from body modification to psychotherapy as a form of treatment. By the mid-twentieth century, gay men were often institutionalized and subjected to electroconvulsive shock therapy to convert them from being gay or alter his or her gender identity. Conversion therapy become discredited as a legitimate medical practice as the mental health profession began to reassess its stance and understanding on homosexuality and gender identity. In 1973 the American Psychiatric Association stopped classifying “homosexuality” as a mental disorder and a year later the American Psychological Association passed a resolution stating that homosexuality implies no social impairment.

Today, all major American medical, psychiatric, physiological, and professional counseling organizations discredit and staunchly criticize conversion therapy. However, conversion therapy is still commonly directed toward LGBT individuals from religious and politically conservative backgrounds. The most well known and largest institution is NARTH and the now defunct Exodus International. Other organizations include North Star, which appeals to Mormons, Joel 2:25 which appeals to Evangelical Christians and Catholics, and People Can Change (now called Brother's Road) which appeals to Mormons and Evangelical Christians. JONAH appealed primarily, but not exclusively to Orthodox Jews in New York City.

Plaintiffs
Five plaintiffs were represented by the Southern Poverty Law Center, Cleary Gottlieb Steen & Hamilton LLP, and Lite DePalma Greenberg LLC. The named plaintiff, Michael Ferguson, had grown up in a conservative Mormon household and had been a client of JONAH. Two additional former clients, Benjamin Unger and Chaim Levin, had both grown up in an Orthodox Jewish community in Brooklyn. All three were consumers of conversion therapy offered by JONAH. The SPLC represented an additional two plaintiffs, Bella Levin, mother of Chaim, and Jo Bruck, mother of Sheldon Bruck who went to JONAH when he was only 17 years old and therefore a minor. Both women were from an Orthodox Jewish community and had paid JONAH for conversion therapy services for their sons.

Defendants
Charles LiMandri from the Freedom of Consciousness Defense Fund who had been a one-time counsel to the National Organization for Marriage represented the three defendants. The defendants were the co-founders of JONAH, Elaine Berk and Arthur A. Goldberg, who had spent 18 months in prison for securities fraud in the early 1990s, and Alan Downing, a life coach and Mormon man who provided conversion therapy for the three male plaintiffs.

Facts and Trial

Pre-Trial Rulings 
On January 30, 2015, JONAH's attorneys motioned  to exclude in their entirety the testimony by the plaintiff’s experts. These expert witnesses were Carol Bernstein, MD.; Janja A. Lalich, Ph.D,; and A. Lee Beckstead, PhD. The court denied this request. Attorney's for the plaintiffs motioned to exclude the expert testimony of the defendants' witnesses. These witnesses were Joseph Berger, MD,; Christopher Doyle, MA, LCPC,; Joseph Nicolosi, PhD.; James E. Phelan, MSW, PhD.; John R. Diggs,; Rabbi Avrohom Stulberger. The court granted the plaintiffs motion.

In the order Judge Bariso wrote, "the existence of a minority of conversion therapy proponents does not and cannot negate the fact that the DSM and its exclusion of homosexuality are generally accepted in the mental health field. Furthermore, a group of a few closely associated experts cannot incestuously validate one another as a means of establishing the reliability of their shared theories…Each of JONAH’s experts proffers the opinion that homosexuality either is a disorder or is not a normal variation of human sexuality. Because the generally accepted scientific theory is that homosexuality is not a mental disorder and not abnormal, these opinions are inadmissible.” The judge further wrote, "the theory that homosexuality is a disorder is not novel but, like the notion that the earth is flat and the sun revolves around it, instead is outdated and refuted. Homosexuality was listed as a mental disorder in the DSM until its removal in 1973. Although the DSM has added newly recognized disorders as a result of evolving Understandings of the medical field, this case presents the opposite situation: the APA removed homosexuality from the DSM upon concluding that it was not a disorder. JONAH has not identified any case that provides a standard for the admission of obsolete and discredited scientific theories. By definition, such theories are unreliable and can offer no assistance to the jury, but rather present only confusion and prejudice."

Trial 

The trial began with jury selection on June 1 and 2, 2015 with opening arguments beginning on June 3, 2015. Attorneys for the plaintiffs argued that JONAH violated the New Jersey Consumer Fraud Act, while the defense argued that the First Amendment and religious freedom allowed them to sell conversion therapy services to people who wanted them.

The plaintiffs presented evidence about one-on-one counseling sessions and group counseling sessions that involved nudity and one instance where a client was told to beat an effigy of his mother with a tennis racket. They also presented evidence about the Journey Into Manhood weekend that involved “healthy touch” which sometimes involved nude cuddling with other clients or life coaches and “guts work” which sometimes required participants to reenact past abuse. The plaintiffs also presented evidence about the JONAH listserv, the primary means through which JONAH communicated with its clients. The plaintiffs proved how Berk posted answers to questions about homosexuality that said gay people were “sick,” “disordered,” and “broken” and that gay people were likely to become alcoholics, abuse children, and die of AIDS.

The plaintiffs called several nationally recognized experts to testify including Dr. Janja Lalich, a sociologist specializing in the study of coercive influence and Dr. Carol Bernstein, the director of the psychiatric residency program at New York University’s medical school and a past president of the American Psychiatric Association. Bernstein testified that JONAH’s treatment methods involving nudity in individual therapy, extended holding between therapist and client, re-creation of traumatic experiences including sexual abuse, and anger transference exercises were not acceptable by any psychiatric professional standard of ethical conduct. If any licensed professional was found to be using such methods, it would warrant disciplinary action up to and including expulsion.

Evidence produced by the plaintiffs showed that Goldberg assured his clients that the JONAH Program had a “two-in-three chance” of success, or a “substantial chance,” or a “70 to 75% chance” for a person to change their sexuality. But when ask by the plaintiff's attorneys to show how he calculated these statistics, Goldberg could not do so because JONAH kept no client records. The statistics quoted by Goldberg were either entirely fictional or based on his own memories of past clients and selective recall of studies on the subject.

The defense called Downing, Berk, and Goldberg to testify about their work at JONAH. The defense also called Jeremy Schwab, founder of the ex-gay organization Joel 2:25 International, Rich Wyler, founder of People Can Change, and Dr. Joseph Berger. They called a series of what they deemed “success story” witnesses including Preston Dahlgren and Jeffrey Bennion who had appeared on the TLC reality show “My Husband’s Not Gay.” At the time Bennion was the sitting Chairman of the Board of Directors of the Mormon conversion therapy organization known as North Star International. The defense called seven “success story witnesses” to demonstrate that treatments offered by JONAH could work. These men claimed to have successfully completed a course of conversion therapy. The first success story witness, Jeffrey Bennion, testified that though he was married and considered himself a success, he was still predominately attracted to men. The remaining “success stories” were similar; not one witness testified that he now experienced regular opposite-sex attraction.  On cross-examination, Dahlgren testified that he sometimes had “slip ups” meaning that he continued to have sexual encounters with other men.

Journey Into Manhood 
A central element of the case involved the Journey Into Manhood experiential weekend retreat that all three plaintiffs had attended at least once. The retreat cost $650 and was often staffed by Alan Downing and other people associated with JONAH and other conversion therapy organizations. People Can Change, founded by Rich Wyler and now known as Brothers Road, organized the retreat at a location in Pennsylvania to which JONAH referred clients.

The plaintiffs testified that upon arrival at the camp their personal belongings, including phones, had been taken from them. During the weekend the plaintiffs testified that they were encouraged by the staff including Downing and Wyler to do “guts work.” “Guts” stands for “Getting Under The Surface." Wyler explained at trial that Guts Work was the psychological work participants needed to complete in order to locate the wounds from their past that had put them on a path of homosexual development.

Ferguson, Levin, and Unger testified that one exercise required them to be blind folded while other participants bounced basketballs and shouted slurs such as “faggot” and “queer” at them. Ferguson had previous detailed an exercise he participated in where clients took turns standing alone at one end of a room while others held hands creating a human chain toward the other end of the room and an additional person stood behind the chain holding two oranges representing testicles. Individuals in the chain blocked the subject from the “testicles” and taunted him with statements such as “you’re such a fag,” “homo,” and “queer boy.” The subject typically expressed anger and aggressively strived to break through the chain to seize the two oranges, sometimes biting and squeezing them to drink the juice and sometimes placing the oranges down his pants.

On the stand, Ferguson testified to a Guts Work activity that involved rolling a participant up in a blanket, which Ferguson and others then wrapped with duct tape. A group leader instructed Ferguson and others to shout slurs such as “faggot,” “queer,” “you fucker,” “homo,” and “pussy.” They were told to use the word “shrimpy” because that particular participant had been taunted in his youth for being short. When asked by the attorney what happened to the young man during this exercise, Ferguson stated, “at that point he started to become very emotional and the leader told us don't stop, keep going, keep going and then that's when he told us to start using shrimpy, so we stood around and started chanting shrimpy and shrimpy and shrimpy and pointing at him, that kind of thing. He started crying harder and harder eventually. We were told don't stop. This is good, he needs this. Don't stop. He needs to get in touch with his manhood. We kept shouting louder and louder at him.”

Ferguson, Levin, and Unger all testified that they had been encouraged to engage in “healthy touch.” Unger testified that Downing had encouraged him to find someone in the group he was attracted to and then to lie down on the floor and cuddle. Other Journeyers were told to do the same thing. When they were all on the floor, the lights were dimmed and the staff turned on a song by Shaina Noll titled How Could Anyone. “There was some really, really, really slow music playing in the background and Alan Downing was in the middle sitting there like kind of watching over us and leading the cuddling healthy touch group session.” Other times, Journeyers were told to have “healthy touch” with the older volunteers so they could receive from the older man his “Golden Father Energy.”

Journey Beyond 
According to Wyler, “Journey Beyond is a much more advanced weekend for men who have done Journey into Manhood and have done additional therapy, additional experiential weekends, other kind or work, and are now looking to advance their work further, especially to explore embracing the opposite sex more.” The weekend cost $850.

Although none of the plaintiffs had participated in the Journey Beyond program, the defense showed a lengthy deposition video of their witness, Jonathan Hoffman, a young man who had participated in the Journey Into Manhood weekends before becoming a part of the staff. Hoffman detailed events of the weekend including a nude rebirthing process, extensive nudity with other participants and staff, and frequently blindfolding participants.

Decision
On June 25, 2015, after a three-week trial, the jury deliberated for only three hours before returning a unanimous verdict in favor of the plaintiffs. After the ruling, one juror told Equality Case Files that the JONAH program was not therapy and the decision was “cut and dried.”  In addition to this first-in-the-nation verdict, a pretrial ruling by the Court declared for the first time in American history that homosexuality was not a mental disease, disorder, or equivalent thereof as a matter of law. David Dinielli, SPLC deputy legal director said, "this verdict is a monumental moment in the movement to ensure the rights and acceptance of LGBT people in America...Conversion therapy and homophobia are based on the same central lie — that gay people are broken and need to be fixed. Conversion therapists, including the defendants in this case, sell fake cures that don’t work but can seriously harm the unsuspecting people who fall into this trap. We’re proud of our clients, who survived these so-called treatments and had the courage to call to account the people who defrauded them with their false promises.”

Legal analysis 
In a lengthy analysis published in Northwestern University Law Review, attorney Peter R. Dubrowski reviewed the strengths of the case and provided a fifty-state survey of state consumer protection laws that could be used to structure a claim similar to those in the JONAH case. Dubrowski wrote that "one state trial court decision in New Jersey creates neither binding precedent nor guaranteed success in future suits against conversion therapists. The case, however, was envisioned as—and is—a powerful model to consider in building future lawsuits."

The evidentiary ruling in which the court ruled that as a matter of law homosexuality is not a sickness means that a core misrepresentation is made every time a conversion therapist accepts payment for “treatment” and every time a therapist provides so-called “therapy.” Dubrowski states that conversion therapy does not work because conversion therapy cannot work, in the sense that it cannot “cure” homosexuality. The misrepresentations at the center of conversion therapy are that homosexuality is abnormal and changeable. These are the very positions held by leaders within the conversion therapy movement. “To admit that homosexuality is neither a disease nor a mental disorder, and that it is not a condition subject to treatment and change, is to implicitly admit that the only basis for continued invectives against the LGBT community is not in science, but in bigotry—be it rooted in religious intolerance or irrational prejudice.” Dubrowski argues that litigation is currently the best route towards national cessation of conversion therapy. Attempts to change sexual orientations have been proven at best ineffective, and at worst harmful. Litigation puts a face on the victims who have suffered physical and mental harm. If the public comes to see conversion therapy as fraud perpetrated against sincerely religious individuals and not merely as a legal-if-distasteful choice, then politicians seeking to pass bans on conversion therapy would be supported in their efforts to protect a religious minority from scam artists.
	
Dubrowski concludes that, “conversion therapists ruin lives. They convince men and women they are sick when they are healthy, and that they can be cured when there is nothing to cure. They employ unethical and dangerous treatment methods such as nudity and 'healthy touch' which are unscientific at best and barely disguised opportunities for erotic contact between therapist and patient at worst. They fail to deliver their promised outcome—because they cannot do so. This is fraud. There is no room for conversion therapists, their services, or their misrepresentations in the American marketplace. For now, at least one jury in New Jersey agrees. In time, with JONAH serving as a model, many more will surely reach a similar verdict.”

References

External links
 Ferguson v. JONAH Complaint
 Defendant's Motion to Dismiss
 Plaintiff's Opposition to Motion to Dismiss
 Defendant's reply to Motion to Opposition to Dismiss
 Order denying Motion to Dismiss
 Order Denying Defendant's Partial Summary Judgement
 Opinion Feb. 5, 2015
 Order Granting Plaintiff's Motion to exclude Defendant's Expert Witnesses
 Order Granting Plaintiff's Motion for Partial Summary Judgement
 Final Judgement
 Order Granting Permanent Injunctive Relief
 Stipulation of Settlement of Final Judgement
 Inside the Court Cast that could end So-Called "Conversion Therapy" For Good
 JONAH, The largest Jewish gay conversion therapy organization, takes its last breath
2015 in United States case law
2015 in New Jersey
2015 in LGBT history
New Jersey state case law
LGBT rights in the United States
Conversion therapy
United States LGBT rights case law